The EuroCup Basketball MVP is the yearly MVP award that is awarded by the 2nd-tier level professional basketball league in Europe, the EuroCup Basketball League, which is the pan-European professional basketball league that is one tier level below the top-tier EuroLeague. 

The EuroCup Basketball MVP award began with the EuroCup Basketball 2008–09 season.

Selection criteria
The EuroCup Basketball MVP was originally selected solely by a panel of the league's basketball experts, from the 2008–09 season, through the 2015–16 season. Starting with the 2016–17 season, online fan voting was added to the award's selection process.

EuroCup Basketball MVP award winners

 There was no awarding in the 2019–20, because the season was cancelled due to the coronavirus pandemic in Europe.

See also
EuroCup awards
EuroCup Finals MVP
EuroLeague
EuroLeague Awards
EuroLeague MVP
EuroLeague Final Four MVP

References

External links
EuroCup Basketball official site

EuroCup Basketball
European basketball awards
Basketball most valuable player awards

it:ULEB Eurocup MVP